Allan Finn Hansen (born 1 May 1952) is a Danish former footballer who played as a defender. He made three appearances for the Denmark national team from 1975 to 1978.

References

External links
 
 

1952 births
Living people
Danish men's footballers
Association football defenders
Denmark international footballers
Denmark youth international footballers
Denmark under-21 international footballers
Holbæk B&I players
FC Vestsjælland players
KFUM Roskilde players